Vladimir Kozak (born 12 June 1993) is an Uzbek professional football player of Ukrainian descent who currently plays for AGMK in Uzbekistan Super League.

Career
He has played his entire career with Pakhtakor Tashkent. He joined the Uzbek team in 2010. His league debut was against Bunyodkor. In 2012 season he scored 5 goals, including a brace against Buxoro. In 2014 season Kozak also scored 5 goals in League matches and won his second champion title with Pakhtakor.

International career
On 29 May 2014 he made his official debut for national team in friendly match Uzbekistan - Oman.

Honours

Club

 Uzbek League (2): 2012, 2014
 Uzbek League runners-up: 2010
 Uzbek Cup (1): 2011

International
 AFC U-19 Championship semifinal:  2012

References

External links

1993 births
Living people
Sportspeople from Tashkent
Uzbekistani footballers
Uzbekistani people of Ukrainian descent
Uzbekistan international footballers
Pakhtakor Tashkent FK players
Association football defenders
Footballers at the 2014 Asian Games
21st-century Ukrainian politicians
Asian Games competitors for Uzbekistan